Sir Anthony George Berry (12 February 1925 – 12 October 1984) was a British Conservative politician. He served as Member of Parliament (MP) for Enfield Southgate and a whip in Margaret Thatcher's government.

Berry served as an MP for nearly 20 years until he was killed in the Brighton hotel bombing by the Provisional IRA.

Personal life

Born in Eton, Buckinghamshire (now in Berkshire), Berry was the sixth and youngest son of newspaper magnate Gomer Berry, 1st Viscount Kemsley, and his wife Mary.

He married firstly, at Westminster in 1954, the Hon. Mary Cynthia Roche (born 1934), a daughter of the 4th Baron Fermoy. Mary's sister, Frances, married John Spencer, 8th Earl Spencer, and so Berry was an uncle of Diana, Princess of Wales.

Berry and his wife Mary had four children: Alexandra Mary (born 1955), Antonia Ruth and Joanna Cynthia (twins, born 1957), and Edward Anthony Morys (born 1960). They divorced in 1966.

He then married Sarah Clifford-Turner at Chelsea in 1966 and had two more children: George (born 1967), and Sasha Jane (born 1969).

Career
In 1962 he was appointed High Sheriff of Glamorgan.

He was elected as Conservative MP for Southgate (later Enfield Southgate) at the 1964 general election, and served in Margaret Thatcher's government after the Conservatives won the 1979 general election. He served as Vice-Chamberlain of the Household between 1979 and 1981, Comptroller of the Household from 1981 to 1983 and was appointed Treasurer of the Household in 1983. He was knighted in December 1983. At the time of his death he was Deputy Chief Whip in Thatcher's government.

Death
On 12 October 1984, Berry was killed in the Brighton hotel bombing, when a bomb was planted in the Grand Brighton Hotel during the Conservative Party Conference. He was 59. He was survived by his wife, Lady Berry, who was injured in the blast. His death occurred three days before the 20th anniversary of his first election to Parliament in 1964.

Berry's death in office triggered a by-election in Enfield Southgate, which was won by future Cabinet minister Michael Portillo.

In September 1986, Patrick Magee who carried out the bombing, received eight life sentences, but was released from prison in 1999 under the terms of the Good Friday Agreement.

Since Magee's release, Berry's daughter, Jo Berry (a mother of three living in North West England), has received attention for her series of controversial meetings with the Brighton bomber, as part of her quest to come to terms with the bombing and, in her own words, "to bring something positive out of it". Some of their discussions were filmed for an Everyman programme, shown on BBC2 in December 2001. She has received some criticism from other families of IRA victims for these meetings.

A ceremony was held in Berry's Enfield Southgate constituency on 12 October 2009, the 25th anniversary of the bombing, at which his widow (wife of Lord Donoughue) and her daughter Sasha unveiled a plaque in his honour at the newly renamed Sir Anthony Berry House in Chaseville Parade, Winchmore Hill.

References

1925 births
1984 deaths
1984 murders in the United Kingdom
Assassinated English politicians
English terrorism victims
Male murder victims
Younger sons of viscounts
Conservative Party (UK) MPs for English constituencies
High Sheriffs of Glamorgan
Deaths by improvised explosive device in England
People from Eton, Berkshire
People killed by the Provisional Irish Republican Army
People murdered in England
Presidents of the Oxford University Conservative Association
Terrorism deaths in England
UK MPs 1964–1966
UK MPs 1966–1970
UK MPs 1970–1974
UK MPs 1974
UK MPs 1974–1979
UK MPs 1979–1983
UK MPs 1983–1987
Treasurers of the Household
Knights Bachelor
Politicians awarded knighthoods
Anthony Berry
Assassinated British MPs
English murder victims